Madson is a British television crime drama series, first broadcast on 17 April 1996, that ran for a total of six episodes on BBC1. The series starred Ian McShane as the title character who, sentenced on forged evidence to life imprisonment, gains a law degree in prison and overturns his conviction. Suddenly freed again after eight years inside, he uses his contacts to secure a position as an outdoor clerk with a top firm of City Solicitors.

The series was produced by McShane's own production company, and was produced by McShane himself, under the guidance of executive producer Chris Parr. The series co-starred Joanna Kanska, Jayne Ashbourne, Matthew Marsh and Charles Gray. Each episode shows the inefficiencies of the law, solves a new crime or helps those whom the law has neglected. Filming on the series took place in West London between 23 August and 29 November 1995. Notably, the series has never been released on DVD.

Cast
 Ian McShane as John Madson 
 Joanna Kanska as Magda Ostrowska
 Jayne Ashbourne as Sarah Madson
 Matthew Marsh as DI Rourke
 Charles Gray as Sir Ranald Hearnley
 David Arlen as Donald
 Thomas Craig as Gordon Berry
 Kate Beckett as Cheryl Berry
 Barney Craig as Dominic
 Shirley Anne Field as Elaine Dews
 Darren Brown as DC Lear
 Andrew Burt as Chief Supt. Walton
 Jonathan Coy as George Lodge
 Julius Grower as Dan Berry

Episodes

References

External links

1996 British television series debuts
1996 British television series endings
1990s British crime television series
1990s British drama television series
BBC television dramas
1990s British television miniseries
English-language television shows
Television shows set in London